Polaciones is a municipality located in the autonomous community of Cantabria, Spain.

Geography

Localities 
 Belmonte, pop. 20  
 Callecedo (Callecéu), pop. 14 
 Cotillos, pop. 6 
 La Laguna (La Llaúna), pop. 12 
 Lombraña (Capital), pop. 13
 Pejanda, pop. 15 
 Puente Pumar (La Puente), pop. 48
 Salceda (Zarcea), pop. 16
 San Mamés, pop. 23
 Santa Eulalia (Santa Olalla), pop. 10
 Tresabuela, pop. 29
 Uznayo (Uznayu), pop. 43

References

Municipalities in Cantabria